Kisaasi is a location, within the city of Kampala, Uganda.

Location
Kisaasi is located in Kawempe Division, in northern Kampala. It is bordered by Ntinda and Bukoto to the south, Kigoowa to the southeast, Kulambiro to the east, Komamboga to the northeast, Unincorporated Wakiso District to the north, Kawempe to the west and Kyebando to the southwest. The coordinates of Kisaasi are:0°22'10.0"N, 32°36'10.0"E (Latitude:0.369450; Longitude:32.602767).

Demographics

Kisaasi is a middle class residential neighborhood, with clusters of upscale residencies. A local professional performing arts group, Ndere Troupe has constructed a performing arts theater, the Ndere Center, within the area. Since 2011, Kampala Capital City Authority (KCCA), has improved the road network in the neighborhood to the delight of many residents and businesses. One such road is the Bukoto-Kisaasi Road, which has been widened and tarmacked.

Points of interest
The following points of interest lie in or near Kisaasi:
 The Kampala Northern Bypass Highway - The highway passes through the southern part of Kisaasi in an east to west direction.
 The Ndere Center - A performing arts complex owned by Ndere Troupe. The complex includes a guest house.
 Kensington Kensington Luxury Heights - A residential housing development by Kensington Africa Limited, a developer with subdivisions in Naguru, and on Lugogo Bypass in Kololo.

See also
 Kampala District
 Kawempe Division
 Mpererwe
 Ntinda

References

External links
 Ndere Troupe Homepage
 Ndere Troupe Founded in 1984
 Kensington Africa Limited Homepage

Neighborhoods of Kampala
Cities in the Great Rift Valley
Kawempe Division